Fortysomething may refer to:
 Fortysomething (term), a person aged between 40 and 49 years
 Fortysomething (TV series), a UK television series with Hugh Laurie
 "Fortysomething" (Frasier episode), an episode of the TV series Frasier